The  New Orleans VooDoo season is the fourth and final season for the franchise. The Voodoo started the season with a 7–2 record, but lost 6 of their last 7 games, finishing with an 8–8 record. This caused them to miss the playoffs, losing a tiebreaker scenario with the New York Dragons who had finished with the same record, and had defeated the VooDoo in the regular season. The team folded 4 months later, but will return in 2011.

Standings

Regular season schedule

Coaching

Roster

Stats

Regular season

Week 1: at Los Angeles Avengers

Week 2: vs. Orlando Predators

Week 3: vs. Tampa Bay Storm

Week 4: vs. Cleveland Gladiators

Week 5: at Colorado Crush

Week 6: vs. San Jose SaberCats

Week 7: at Dallas Desperados

Week 8: at Arizona Rattlers

Week 9: vs. Utah Blaze

Week 10: at Georgia Force

Week 11: at Tampa Bay Storm

Week 12
Bye Week

Week 13: vs. Georgia Force

Week 14: vs. Columbus Destroyers

Week 15: at New York Dragons

Week 16: at Orlando Predators

Week 17: vs. Grand Rapids Rampage

References

External links

New Orleans VooDoo
New Orleans VooDoo seasons
New Orleans VooDoo